Purevdorj Erdenebat (born 10 February 1994), is a Mongolian international footballer who plays as a midfielder for Mongolian National Premier League side Ulaanbaatar University Football Club.

International career
Purevdorj made his international debut in a 2–2 draw with Macau at the 2017 EAFF E-1 Football Championship. He replaced Murun Altankhuyag in the 80th minute.

International statistics

International goals
Scores and results list Mongolia's goal tally first.

References

External links
 

1994 births
Living people
Mongolian footballers
Mongolia international footballers
Association football midfielders